Stones Landing is an unincorporated community in Lassen County, California. It lies at an elevation of 5134 feet (1565 m). Its population is 86 as of the 2020 census.

References

Unincorporated communities in California
Unincorporated communities in Lassen County, California